Vasily Sergeyevich Molokov (settlement of Irininskoye, Moscow Governorate – 29 December 1982, Moscow) was a Soviet aircraft pilot, major general of aviation (1940), and a Hero of the Soviet Union (29 April 1934).

Birth and Youth 
From 1904 he worked in a box workshop in Moscow, then as a hammerer and metalworker in a smithy.

Army Service 
Vasily Molokov enlisted in the Imperial Russian Army in 1915. He then joined the Red Army in January 1918 and took part in the Russian Civil War. In 1921, he graduated from the Naval Aviation School in Samara and then took training extension courses at the Zhukovsky Air Force Engineering Academy (1929). Since 1925 Molokov was member of the Communist Party.

Civil Aviation and Feat 
In 1931, Vasily Molokov joined the civil aviation. He flew the airlines in Siberia and Far East of Russia. In April 1934 he took part in the successful Arctic aerial rescue operation saving people from the sunken steamship Cheliuskin from an improvised airfield on the ice of the Chukchi Sea. Vasily Molokov saved 39 men - more than any other pilot. His two-seat R-5 took on board 6 men, using parachute boxes under the wings for carrying passengers. He was awarded the title of the Hero of the Soviet Union for this deed.

After the Deed 
In 1935, Molokov performed an outstanding for that time flight by route Krasnoyarsk-Kirensk-Yakutsk-Nagaevo-Nizhnekolymsk-Uelen and back along the Arctic coast to Arkhangelsk on a Dornier Do J flying boat. This flight has opened a new line over Eastern Siberia and Kamchatka.

In 1936, Vasily Molokov performed a flight along the Soviet Arctic coast. In 1937, he participated in a North Pole expedition as the command pilot of TB-3, he deployed crew of a drifting ice station. In 1938, Molokov was appointed head of the Air Fleet Chief Directorate. During the German-Soviet War, he was appointed at October 9, 1941 authorized representative of the State Defence Committee on the creation of ALSIB - classified ferrying route for aircraft from Fairbanks to Krasnoyarsk. 

For a short period he headed the Gromov Flight Research Institute (1942–1943).

Later (since 1943) Molokov commanded the 213th Night Bomber Aviation Division on the Western and 3rd Belorussian Fronts. In 1947, he was withdrawn to reserve.

He has died in 1982. Molokov is buried in Moscow, in Kuntsevo Cemetery. 

Vasily Molokov's son, Valery (born at October 3, 1924), World War II veteran, graduated from Bauman Moscow State Technical University, worked in aerospace industry.

Honours and awards
 Hero of the Soviet Union
 Three Orders of Lenin
 Two Orders of the Red Banner
 Order of Suvorov 2nd class
 Order of Kutuzov 2nd class
 Order of the Patriotic War 1st class
 Order of the Red Star,
 campaign and jubilee medals

Memory 
 In 1934 his birthplace, Irininskoye, was renamed to Molokovo.
In 1935 a postmark, dedicated to Vasily Molokov, was issued in USSR.
A statue was installed in 2010 at his birthplace to commemorate his 115th birthday.
Molokov Cape at Franz Jozef Land was named after him.
Molokov Island at Yenisei River.
Ulitsa Molokova (Molokov Street) In Moscow, Krasnoyarsk, Ekaterinburg.

References

1895 births
1982 deaths
People from Moscow Oblast
People from Podolsky Uyezd
Communist Party of the Soviet Union members
Central Executive Committee of the Soviet Union members
First convocation members of the Soviet of the Union
Soviet major generals
Soviet Air Force generals
Soviet Navy personnel
Soviet aviators
Russian aviators
Gromov Flight Research Institute employees
Russian military personnel of World War I
Soviet military personnel of the Russian Civil War
Soviet World War II pilots
Heroes of the Soviet Union
Recipients of the Order of Lenin
Recipients of the Order of the Red Banner
Recipients of the Order of Suvorov, 2nd class
Recipients of the Order of Kutuzov, 2nd class
Recipients of the Order of the Red Star
Burials at Kuntsevo Cemetery